Battlefield Earth (also referred to as Battlefield Earth: A Saga of the Year 3000) is a 2000 American science fiction film based on the 1982 novel by Scientology founder L. Ron Hubbard. It was directed by Roger Christian and stars John Travolta, Barry Pepper, and Forest Whitaker. The film follows a rebellion against the alien Psychlos, who have ruled Earth for 1,000 years.

Travolta, a Scientologist, began attempting to adapt Battlefield Earth in the mid-1990s. He was unable to obtain major studio funding because of concerns regarding the script and its connections to Scientology. In 1998, it was picked up by independent production company Franchise Pictures, which specialized in rescuing stars' pet projects. Production began in 1999, largely funded by the German distribution company Intertainment AG. Travolta, as co-producer, also contributed millions of dollars; he envisioned Battlefield Earth as the first in a two-part adaptation of the book, as it only covers the first half of the novel's story.

Released to critical and commercial failure, Battlefield Earth is frequently described as one of the worst films of all time. Reviewers criticized nearly every aspect of the film, including the acting, characters, direction, cinematography, pacing, editing, screenplay, special effects, musical score, plot holes, and lack of action, originality and character development. Audiences were reported to have ridiculed early screenings and stayed away from the film after its opening weekend. It received eight Golden Raspberry Awards, which until 2012 was the most Razzie Awards given to a single film, and in 2010, it won Worst Picture of the Decade.

In 2007, Franchise Pictures was sued by its investors and went bankrupt after it emerged that it had fraudulently overstated the film's budget by $31 million; this, coupled with the film's poor reception, ended Travolta's plans for a sequel.

Plot 
In 3000, Earth is a desolate wasteland. The Psychlos, a brutal race of giant humanoid aliens, have ruled the planet for 1,000 years, and use human slave labor to strip its minerals and other resources, with a special desire for gold. A few primitive hunter-gatherer tribes of humans live in freedom in remote, hidden areas, but after ten centuries of Psychlo oppression, they have abandoned any hope of regaining control of their planet. Jonnie Goodboy Tyler rejects this universal hopelessness and leaves his tribe in the Rocky Mountains on a journey of exploration with a nomad hunter named Carlo. Both are captured by a Psychlo raiding party and transported to a slave camp in the ruins of Denver, Colorado, the Psychlos' principal base of operations. A massive dome over the base protects the Psychlos from Earth's atmosphere, which is toxic to them.

At the camp, they meet Terl, the Psychlo security chief, and his deputy, Ker. Terl's superiors have had him reassigned to his remote Earth outpost indefinitely following unexplained incidents involving "the Senator's daughter". He plans to bribe his way back to the Psychlo home planet by illegally mining gold in areas of high radioactivity. Psychlos avoid such areas because radiation reacts explosively with the gas mixture that they breathe. Terl observes that Jonnie is a resourceful human and selects him to lead the mining operation. Jonnie acquires a comprehensive knowledge of human history and literature in a Psychlo rapid-learning machine. He defiantly declares that one day, humans will overthrow the Psychlos and retake their planet. An amused Terl shows Jonnie the ruins of Denver and its public library and boasts that the Psychlos conquered all of Earth in only nine minutes early in the 21st century. Jonnie spends time in the library and is particularly inspired by the Declaration of Independence.

Terl gives Jonnie a party of slaves and a Psychlo flying shuttle and orders him to find gold. Jonnie locates a plentiful supply at the long-abandoned Fort Knox. He also discovers an abandoned underground military base with working Harrier jump jets, weapons, and fuel. While they are supposed to be laboring in the mines, Jonnie and his followers plot a revolution, training themselves in aerial combat using the military base's flight simulators.

After a week of training, the rebels launch their attack. In a suicide mission, Carlo flies his Psychlo flying shuttle into the Denver dome, destroying it and suffocating the Psychlos inside. Jonnie captures a teleportation device and uses it to teleport a dirty bomb to the Psychlo home world. When it detonates, the radiation it releases reacts catastrophically with the Psychlo atmosphere, destroying all life on the planet. The humans have retaken Earth but face an uncertain future. The last Psychlo survivors are Terl—who is imprisoned inside Fort Knox, in a makeshift cell surrounded by gold bars, as a bargaining chip in the event of a counterattack by Psychlos living off their home world—and Ker, who joins the victorious humans in their challenging project to rebuild their civilization.

Cast 
 John Travolta as Terl
 Barry Pepper as Jonnie Goodboy Tyler
 Forest Whitaker as Ker
 Kim Coates as Carlo
 Sabine Karsenti as Chrissy
 Richard Tyson as Robert the Fox
 Kelly Preston as Chirk
 Michael MacRae as District Manager Zete
 Shaun Austin-Olsen as Planetship Numph
 Tim Post as the Assistant Planetship
 Michael Byrne as Parson staffer
 Christian Tessier as Mickey
 Sylvain Landry as Sammy
 Earl Pastko as the Bartender
 Noël Burton as the Clinko Learning instructor

Production

Initial deals

1982–1986: Hubbard period 
After Battlefield Earth was published in 1982, L. Ron Hubbard suggested that a film version of the book was in the works. He gave an interview in February 1983 to the Rocky Mountain News in which he told the reporter, "I've recently written three screenplays, and some interest has been expressed in Battlefield Earth, so I suppose I'll be right back in Hollywood one of these days and probably on location in the Denver area for Battlefield Earth when they film it."

Hubbard's comments suggest that he saw himself being directly involved in the film's production; author Stewart Lamont suggests that Hubbard may even have envisioned directing it, having previously helmed Scientology training films. In October 1983, the film rights were sold by the Church of Scientology's in-house literary agency, Author Services Inc., to Salem Productions of Los Angeles. Two films were envisaged, each covering half of the book and tentatively budgeted at $15 million each. William Immerman was set as the producer for the film. Veteran screenwriter Abraham Polonsky and British director Ken Annakin were hired to produce a film breakdown, with production scheduled to begin in 1985. In November 1984, Santa Monica public relations firm Dateline Communications announced a nationwide contest to promote the film. First- and second-place prizes were an all-expense-paid trip to the film's production location and a paid walk-on part in the film, and other announced prizes included a trip to Los Angeles for the world premiere, records, cassettes, and hardcover and paperback copies of the novel. A 30-foot (10 m) high inflatable figure of the film's villain, Terl, was erected by Scientology officials on Hollywood Boulevard in 1984 in an effort to promote the production, and auditions were held in Denver. The low-budget project soon collapsed, and Hubbard died soon afterward, in 1986.

1990s: Travolta's development 
Travolta had converted to Scientology in 1975 and subsequently became one of the Church of Scientology's most prominent supporters. Hubbard sent him an autographed copy of Battlefield Earth when the book was first published in 1982; he reportedly hoped that Travolta would turn the book into a film "in the vein of Star Wars and Close Encounters of the Third Kind". While Travolta was interested, his influence in Hollywood at the time was at a low after participating in a series of flops. He gained renewed influence with the success of the 1994 film Pulp Fiction, which garnered Travolta an Academy Award nomination for Best Actor. He had not forgotten Hubbard's wishes to see the book on the big screen and took on the task of making Battlefield Earth into a movie. Travolta described the book in interviews as "like Pulp Fiction for the year 3000" and "like Star Wars, only better".
He lobbied influential figures in Hollywood to fund the project and was reported to have recruited the aid of fellow Scientologists in promoting it. According to Bill Mechanic, the former head of 20th Century Fox, "John wanted me to make Battlefield Earth. He had Scientologists all over me. They come up to you and they know who you are. And they go, 'We're really excited about Battlefield Earth. This did not impress Mechanic: "Do you think in any way, shape, or form that weirding me out is going to make me want to make this movie?"

Travolta's involvement in Battlefield Earth was first publicized in late 1995. He told the New York Daily News that "Battlefield Earth is the pinnacle of using my power for something. I told my manager, 'If we can't do the things now that we want to do, what good is the power? Let's test it and try to get the things done that we believe in. It was assumed from the start that Travolta would star in and produce the film, which would be distributed by Metro-Goldwyn-Mayer (MGM); J. D. Shapiro was to write the screenplay. Shapiro was eventually fired because he refused to accept some suggestions from the studio producers that changed the tone of his script, including removing key scenes and characters. In 1997, Travolta's long-time manager, Jonathan Krane, signed a two-year deal with 20th Century Fox under which that studio would release Battlefield Earth instead of MGM, but the deal with Fox also fell through. James Robert Parish, author of Fiasco: A History of Hollywood's Iconic Flops, comments that both MGM and Fox regarded the project as too risky on several grounds: Its heavy reliance on special effects would be very expensive, pushing the budget up to as much as $100 million; Hubbard's narrative was seen as naïve and outdated; and the "Scientology factor" could work against the film, negating Travolta's star power. As one studio executive put it, "On any film there are ten variables that can kill you. On this film there was an eleventh: Scientology. It just wasn't something anyone really wanted to get involved with."

Franchise Pictures 
In 1998, the project was taken over by Franchise Pictures, a recently established company whose head, Elie Samaha, a former dry-cleaning mogul turned nightclub-owner, specialized in rescuing stars' pet projects. Franchise sought out stars whose projects were stalled at the major studios, bringing them aboard at reduced salaries. Samaha's approach made waves in Hollywood, earning him a reputation of being able to produce star vehicles more cheaply than the larger studios. His unorthodox deals raised eyebrows and the entertainment industry magazine Variety commented that they were "often so complex and variable as to leave outsiders scratching their heads". As Samaha put it, "I said, 'If John wants to make this movie, what does he want to get paid?' ... Because I do not pay anybody what they make. That is not my business plan. He learned of Battlefield Earth from Cassian Elwes, an agent at the theatrical agency William Morris, and approached Travolta. A deal was soon struck and financing was arranged; Travolta significantly reduced his normal fee of $20 million, lowering the film's cost from the $100 million that had previously been forecast, and costs were reduced further by using Canadian locations and facilities.

The film was set up as an independent production for Morgan Creek Productions which would release the film through Warner Bros. in the United States under an existing distribution agreement. Travolta's company JTP Films was also involved, and Travolta invested $5 million of his own money in the production. Warner Bros. allocated $20 million for the film's marketing and distribution. Franchise retained the foreign rights, licensing the European distribution rights to the German group Intertainment AG in exchange for 47% of the production costs which were set at $75 million. The Intertainment deal later became the focus of a legal action that bankrupted Franchise. Samaha forecast that the film would be a hit: "My projected numbers on Battlefield Earth are really conservative. I'm already covered internationally, and there's no way I'm going to lose if the movie does $35 million domestically. And Travolta has never had an action movie do under $35 million."

According to Samaha, he got around the "negative factor" of the Scientology connection by the simple expedient of "yell[ing] at everyone, 'This is a science-fiction film starring John Travolta!' again and again". Samaha acknowledged that "everyone thought I was crazy or mentally retarded" for taking on the project, but pitched the film as "Planet of the Apes starring John Travolta". Others in Hollywood were still skeptical; an unnamed producer was quoted by the Los Angeles Daily News as saying that "Battlefield Earth has the stench of death. It should never have been made. It's an $80 million vanity project for Travolta." Travolta's theatrical agency William Morris was also said to be unenthusiastic, reportedly leading to Travolta threatening to leave them if they did not help him to set up the film. Fellow Scientologist Tom Cruise was said to have warned Warner Bros. that he thought the movie was a bad idea. Cruise's spokesperson later denied this.

Author Services Inc. and Church of Scientology 
In 1999, Author Services Inc., which controls Hubbard's copyrights, said that it was "donating its share of the profits from the film to charitable organizations that direct drug education and drug rehabilitation programs around the world". It was reported that the merchandising revenues would be passed on to the Scientology-linked groups Narconon, a drug rehabilitation program, and Applied Scholastics, which promotes Hubbard's Study tech, with movie-related sales of the book funding the marketing of Hubbard's fiction books and the L. Ron Hubbard Writers of the Future contest. The size of the revenue deal was not disclosed by the parties; Trendmasters, the makers of the Battlefield Earth line of toys, stated that its deal was strictly with Franchise Pictures, which declined to comment, and Warner Bros. stated that its role was limited to distribution and had nothing to do with the associated merchandising deals.

In February 2000, Church of Scientology spokesman Mike Rinder told Tribune Media Services that any spinoff deals based on Hubbard's novel would benefit Author Services Inc.; another Church spokesman, Aron Mason, stated, "The church has no financial interest in Battlefield Earth. Author Services is not part of the Church of Scientology. They are a literary agency without any connection to the church."

Travolta's manager Jonathan Krane denied that the Church of Scientology was playing any part in the production: "I've never even dealt with or talked to the church on this. This is an action-adventure, science-fiction story. Period. The movie has nothing to do with Scientology." Krane stated that the film had been financed "without a dollar coming from the Scientologists". Some people in Hollywood feared that Travolta was using his box office draw to promote Scientology teachings, and one film producer stated, "This film could encourage kids to embrace the whole strange world of Scientology." Travolta stated, "I'm doing it because it's a great piece of science fiction. This is not about Hubbard. I'm very interested in Scientology, but that's personal. This is different." In a separate interview Travolta commented on the perceived similarities between Battlefield Earth and Scientology: "Well, they are kind of synonymous ... L. Ron Hubbard is very famous for Scientology and Dianetics. On the other hand, he's equally as famous in the science fiction world. So for people to think that ... look, I don't want everybody to try Scientology. I don't really care if somebody thinks that. I'm not worried about it. You can't be. The truth of why I'm doing it is because it's a great piece of science fiction. I'm going to be the wickedest 9-foot alien you've ever seen in your life."

Pre-production 
Travolta and his manager, Jonathan Krane, took the lead in hiring the on-set personnel. They initially approached Quentin Tarantino to direct the film. When Tarantino declined, Roger Christian, a protégé of George Lucas, was recruited as the director on the advice of Lucas. Christian had most recently been the second unit director on Lucas' Star Wars: Episode I – The Phantom Menace. Patrick Tatopoulos was signed to develop the production design and costumes, including the design of the alien Psychlos, and Czech composer Elia Cmiral was signed to provide the film's score. Travolta and Krane also signed cinematographer Giles Nuttgens and most of the principal actors. Corey Mandell signed on to write the script for the film, which had previously gone through 10 revisions. Mandell stated in an interview, "I am not a Scientologist ... I came on board because John asked me to read the book and said, 'It's not a religious book. It's a science-fiction story. There's nothing sacred about the story, nothing of the religious philosophy. I was given this to read purely as science fiction – to see whether it was intriguing as a movie. And it was."

Filming 

Filmed in Canada, principal photography took place in Montreal, Saint-Jean-sur-Richelieu, and several other Quebec locations during the summer and autumn of 1999. In parallel, second unit shooting took place in Jeju Island, South Korea. In January 1999, Travolta flew his private Boeing 707 on a secret visit to Montreal to scout out locations for shooting. The film was reported to have been the most expensive production shot in Canada up to that point. It was also reported that the production costs would have been twice as high had the film been shot in the United States. Almost every shot in the film is at a Dutch angle, because, according to Roger Christian, he wanted the film to look like a comic book.

Travolta's wife Kelly Preston also appeared in one scene, playing Terl's "baldish Psychlo girlfriend" Chirk. Travolta originally saw himself in the role of Jonnie, but by the time the movie was actually made, Travolta felt he was too old to play the role, and took the role of the main villain instead. Travolta's role in the film required what he described as an amazing physical transformation: "I wear a tall head apparatus with strange hair. I have amber eyes and talons for hands. It's quite remarkable ... I'm on 4-foot stilts." To star in the film, Travolta turned down the movie The Shipping News and postponed production on Standing Room Only.

The film was "plagued by bad buzz" before release with the media speculating about the possible influence of Scientology and commenting on the production's tight security. As the film was entering post-production, the alternative newspaper Mean Magazine obtained a copy of the screenplay. Means staffers changed the script's title to "Dark Forces", re-attributed it to "Desmond Finch", and circulated it to readers at major Hollywood film production companies. The comments that came back were unfavorable: "a thoroughly silly plotline is made all the more ludicrous by its hamfisted dialog and ridiculously shallow characterizations", "a completely predictable story that just isn't written well enough to make up for its lack of originality". One reviewer labeled the screenplay "as entertaining as watching a fly breathe".

Release 
Battlefield Earth was released on May 12, 2000, three days after the 50th anniversary of the publication of Hubbard's book Dianetics: The Modern Science of Mental Health, a date celebrated by Scientologists worldwide as a major Scientology holiday. Its premiere was held on May 10, 2000, at Grauman's Chinese Theatre on Hollywood Boulevard in Los Angeles.

Box office 

The film's scathingly bad reviews and poor word-of-mouth led to a precipitous falling-off in its grosses. Having earned $11,548,898 from 3,307 screens on its opening weekend, its take collapsed by 67 percent to $3,924,921 the following weekend, giving an average take of $1,158 per screen. The film made almost 54 percent of its entire domestic gross in its first three days and flatlined thereafter, with earnings dropping a further 75 percent by the end of its third week to $1 million. The following week, facing earnings of just $205,745, Warner Bros. attempted to cut its losses by slashing the number of screens at which the film was being shown. The number was reduced from 2,587 to 641. By its sixth weekend on release, the film was showing on 95 screens and had made $18,993 in a week – less than $200 per screen.

The film ultimately earned $21,471,685 in the United States and Canada and $8,253,978 internationally for a total of $29,725,663 worldwide, falling well short of its reported $73 million production budget and $20 million in estimated marketing costs. Financially, it is regarded as one of the most expensive box office bombs in film history.

In a 2006 list of "The top 10 biggest box office failures", Kat Giantis of MSN Movies placed Battlefield Earth as tied with Inchon (both of which are sponsored by their respective religious movements: Scientology and the Unification Church) for number seven.

Merchandising 
A limited range of merchandising was produced for the film, including posters, a soundtrack CD by Elia Cmíral recorded by the Seattle Symphony, and a re-released version of the novel with a new cover based on the film's poster. Trendmasters also produced a range of action figures of the main characters, including an  figure of Travolta as Terl voicing lines from the film such as "Exterminate all man-animals at will!", "You wouldn't last one day at the academy", and "Man is an endangered species". Despite pre-release reports that the toy spoke the phrase "ratbastard", a line not present in the novel or film, the retail version does not.

Home media 
A special edition DVD was released in 2001, deleting one scene and including two additional scenes which added two minutes to the film's running time. The DVD includes commentary tracks with director Roger Christian and production, costume and creature designer Patrick Tatopoulos, as well as special features including John Travolta's alien makeup test. Jeff Berkwits of Sci Fi Weekly wrote that "the Battlefield Earth Special Edition DVD is packed with information, offering an enlightening glimpse into the creative process behind this imperfect but entertaining picture". Randy Salas of the Star Tribune described it as the "Best DVD for a bad movie." A review of the DVD release in the Los Angeles Times was more critical: "A dated visual style, patched-together special effects and ludicrous dialogue combine in a film that is a wholly miserable experience."

The original theatrical version was released on Blu-ray by Mill Creek Entertainment on September 15, 2020.

Reception 

On Rotten Tomatoes, the film had a score of 3% based on 152 reviews with an average rating of 2.8/10. The critical consensus stated: "Ugly, campy, and poorly acted, Battlefield Earth is a stunningly misguided, aggressively bad sci-fi folly." On Metacritic, as of September 2020, the film had an average score of 9 out of 100, based on 33 critics, indicating "overwhelming dislike". Audiences polled by CinemaScore gave the film a grade of "D+" on an A+ to F scale.

The film was greeted with widespread derision in preview screenings. An audience of Los Angeles entertainment journalists, critics, and others greeted the film with guffaws and hoots at a screening in Century City while other viewers in Washington, D.C., and Baltimore responded with derisive laughter or simply walked out. At a post-launch publicity event, Travolta, on asking assembled journalists if they had enjoyed it, received no reply. He later asserted that other filmmakers had enjoyed the film: "When I felt better about everything was when George Lucas and Quentin Tarantino, and a lot of people that I felt knew what they were doing, saw it and thought it was a great piece of science fiction." Christian also spoke of an initially positive reception, mentioning an enthusiastic response from both the audience and Tarantino.

Chicago Sun-Times film critic Roger Ebert gave the film the rating of half a star out of four, and compared his screening to:  Leonard Maltin rated the film a "BOMB" in his book Leonard Maltin's Movie Guide, writing: "Clumsy plot, misplaced satire, unbelievable coincidences, and a leaden pace trample Travolta's weird but amusing performance." David Bleiler gave the film one star out of four in the TLA Video & DVD Guide, writing: "This is disjointed, tedious, and every bit as bad as its reputation." Jon Stewart mocked the film on his television program The Daily Show, describing it as "a cross between Star Wars and the smell of ass".

Rita Kempley of The Washington Post commented: "A million monkeys with a million crayons would be hard-pressed in a million years to create anything as cretinous as Battlefield Earth. This film version of L. Ron Hubbard's futuristic novel is so breathtakingly awful in concept and execution, it wouldn't tax the smarts of a troglodyte." Elvis Mitchell of The New York Times wrote: "It may be a bit early to make such judgments, but Battlefield Earth may well turn out to be the worst movie of this century" and called it "Plan 9 from Outer Space for a new generation." The British film critic Jonathan Ross said: "Everything about Battlefield Earth sucks. Everything. The over-the-top music, the unbelievable sets, the terrible dialogue, the hammy acting, the lousy special effects, the beginning, the middle and especially the end." The Hollywood Reporter summarized the film as being "a flat-out mess, by golly, with massive narrative sinkholes, leading to moments of outstanding disbelief in the muddled writing and shockingly chaotic mise en scène that's accompanied by ear-pummeling sound and bombastic music."

Many critics singled out the excessive use of angled camera shots.  "The director, Roger Christian, has learned from better films that directors sometimes tilt their cameras", wrote Ebert, "but he has not learned why".  Derivative special effects and illogical plotting were also widely criticized. The Providence Journal highlighted the film's unusual color scheme: "Battlefield Earth's primary colors are blue and gray, adding to the misery. Whenever we glimpse sunlight, the screen goes all stale yellow, as though someone had urinated on the print. This, by the way, is not such a bad idea."

The reviews were not uniformly negative. Bob Graham of the San Francisco Chronicle wrote that the film "effectively presented" the "wary, uncomprehending relationship" between the humans and the Psychlos. A review at JoBlo's Movie Reviews was also positive; Berge Garabedian wrote, "Despite starting off like a bad Star Trek episode, this film eventually graduates to a higher level with great special effects, some really slick bad-ass aliens, an intriguing premise, and a good flow of loud, campy fun." Luke Thompson of New Times LA wrote: "Think Independence Day without the ponderous build-up or self-importance. Imagine how much more enjoyable the other blockbuster-of-the-moment, Gladiator, might have been if Joaquin Phoenix had addressed every one of his rivals as 'Rat brain. Sean Axmaker of the Seattle Post-Intelligencer wrote positively of the interaction between Travolta and Whitaker in the film, comparing them to Abbott and Costello. Axmaker wrote that they provide "much-needed comic relief in an otherwise humorless paean to freedom". Axmaker also wrote positively of the production design used in the film, commenting that the director had created "a world of crumbling dead cities and empty malls turned into human hunting grounds". Hap Erstein of The Palm Beach Post commented: "production designer Patrick Tatopoulos contributes some good work, imagining the ruins of Denver and Washington, D.C., with echoes of Planet of the Apes." In her book I Love Geeks: The Official Handbook, Carrie Tucker lists Battlefield Earth as a cult classic in the "so bad, it's good" genre.

Filmmakers' response 
J.D. Shapiro, who wrote the original screenplay, was critical of the film as well. In a 2010 letter to The New York Post, he asserted that his draft bore little resemblance to the final script; the result, he said, was embarrassing: "The only time I saw the movie was at the premiere, which was one too many times."

Responding to the criticism, one of the film's producers, Elie Samaha, complained: "[The] critics were waiting for us to ... chop our heads off. Everybody hated Scientology for some reason. I didn't know people were so prejudiced."  Ebert noted, however, that the film "contains no evidence of Scientology, or any other system of thought."

Accolades 

Battlefield Earth frequently appears on worst film lists, and is included on Rotten Tomatoes' "100 Worst of the Worst Movies" list. Rotten Tomatoes ranked the film 27th in the 100 worst reviewed films of the first decade of the 21st century. The Arizona Republic listed it as the worst film of 2000, and called it a "monumentally bad sci-fi flick". In 2003, Richard Roeper placed the film on his alphabetized list of his forty least favorite films of all time, writing, "The real danger of Scientology is that John Travolta may someday make another movie based on the writings of L. Ron Hubbard." In 2001 the film received the "Worst Picture" award from the Dallas-Fort Worth Film Critics Association. James Franklin of McClatchy-Tribune News Service put the film as the worst of his "summer blockbuster bombs" list, giving it a rating of four stars for "traumatic" on his scale of how the films "generate a perverse sense of nostalgia". Christopher Null of Filmcritic.com listed the film's villain Terl at number 8 of his "10 Least Effective Movie Villains", writing: "we still can't imagine how anyone would go face to face with one of these creatures and react with anything other than simple laughter."

Battlefield Earth swept the 2000 Golden Raspberry Awards and received seven "Razzies", including Worst Picture, Worst Actor (Travolta), Worst Supporting Actor (Pepper), Worst Supporting Actress (Preston), Worst Director (Christian), Worst Screenplay (Mandell and Shapiro) and Worst Screen Couple (Travolta and "anyone sharing the screen with him"). This tied for the highest number of Razzies won by a single film at that time, with Showgirls achieving seven wins in 1995. Battlefield Earth was later awarded an eighth Razzie for "Worst Drama of Our First 25 Years". In 2010, the film received an award for "Worst Picture of the Decade", bringing its total number of Razzie Awards to nine and consequently setting a record for the most Razzies won by a single film. That record was surpassed in 2012 when Jack and Jill won ten awards.

As Travolta did not attend to collect his trophies, an action figure of Terl, his character, accepted them in his place. Travolta responded a week later to the awards: "I didn't even know there were such awards. I have people around me whose job it is to not tell me about such things. They're obviously doing their job. Not every film can be a critical and box office success. It would have been awful only if Battlefield Earth was neither. That's not the case. It is edging toward the $100m mark which means it has found an audience even if it didn't impress critics. I'd rather my films connect with audiences than with critics because it gives you more longevity as a performer." He later insisted that he still felt "really good about it. Here I was taking big chances, breaking a new genre."

Pepper said that he regretted not having been invited to the Razzies and blamed the film's failure on "a weak script and poor production values". Writer J. D. Shapiro received his Worst Screenplay award from Razzies founder John J. B. Wilson during a radio program; he commented that Travolta had called the script "the Schindler's List of science fiction". Shapiro also made an appearance to pick up the Worst Picture of the Decade award at the 30th Golden Raspberry Awards, giving a speech quoting negative reviews, and thanking both the studio for firing him and Corey Mandell for "rewriting my script in a way I never, ever, ever — could have imagined or conceived of myself."

The film's producer, Elie Samaha, declared that he welcomed the "free publicity", as "the more the critics [bash] Battlefield Earth, the more DVDs it sells. It is the kind of film that makes a movie legend and we feel we have enough staying power to last long after the critics have quieted down."

At the 2000 Stinkers Bad Movie Awards, the film received individual nominations in nine categories and won in eight of them: Worst Picture, Worst Director (Christian), Worst Actor (Travolta, also for Lucky Numbers), Worst On-Screen Couple (Travolta and anyone in the entire galaxy), Worst On-Screen Group (The Psychlos and Man-Animals), Most Unintentionally Funny Movie, Worst On-Screen Hairstyle (Travolta and Whitaker), and Least "Special" Special Effects. It also received a nomination for Worst Supporting Actor (Pepper) but lost to Tom Green for Road Trip and Charlie's Angels. The Stinkers later unveiled their "100 Years, 100 Stinkers" list in which people voted for the 100 worst films of the 20th century. Battlefield Earth not only made the final ballot; it took home the top prize for Worst Film of the Century. The provided commentary is listed on the side.

Allegations of Scientology influence 
Stacy Brooks, then-president of the Lisa McPherson Trust, stated: "There's no way that this movie would be happening without Scientology's backing ... This is one example of how Scientology insinuates itself in various aspects of the culture." Mark Bunker characterized the film as a recruitment tactic for the Church of Scientology, stating, "It's designed to introduce L. Ron Hubbard to a whole new generation of kids. It's there to plant a favorable seed in children's minds." Bunker criticized the promotional methods of the film—instead of granting interviews about the film to the press, John Travolta went on a book tour and signed copies of L. Ron Hubbard's novel. Bunker stated, "When Michael Caine goes around to promote The Cider House Rules, he doesn't tour bookstores and sign copies of John Irving's novel ... Through the movie tie-in with the book, kids will send in the card to get their free poster, and eventually be introduced to Dianetics." Scientologist Nancy O'Meara, at the time treasurer of the Foundation for Religious Freedom and currently treasurer of the Scientology-run New Cult Awareness Network, responded to Bunker's statement: "Gimme a break ... That's like saying people are going to go see Gladiator and then suddenly find themselves wanting to explore Christianity."

Before the film was released, rumors and allegations began to circulate that Battlefield Earth contained subliminal messages promoting Scientology. Former Scientologist Lawrence Wollersheim, in a press release issued by his group Fight Against Coercive Tactics Network, said that the Church of Scientology "has placed highly advanced subliminal messages in the Battlefield Earth film master to surreptitiously recruit new members from the movie audience and to get the audience to develop a revulsion for psychiatry and current mental health organizations and practices". Warner Bros. dismissed the claims as "silly nonsense", the Church of Scientology denounced them as "hogwash" and the media reacted with skepticism; as the Scottish journalist Duncan Campbell put it, "the only subliminal voice I could detect came about 10 minutes into this 121-minute film and it seemed to be saying Leeeaaave thisssss cinemmmaaa nooow". When asked about the similarities between the film and Scientology beliefs in intergalactic travel and aliens, church spokesman Aron Mason stated, "That's a pretty crude parallel ... You'd have to make some serious leaps of logic to make that comparison." John Travolta also stated that the film was not inspired by Scientology tenets.

Hugh Urban of Ohio State University notes a number of connections between Scientology and Battlefield Earth in his 2011 book The Church of Scientology: A History of a New Religion. Not only was the film released only three days after the 50th anniversary of the publication of Hubbard's book Dianetics: The Modern Science of Mental Health, but the villainous Psychlos have been interpreted by many observers as an obvious allusion to Scientology's bête noire, psychiatry. The conflict between the Psychlos and the free humans can be seen as a reflection of Scientology's own conception of itself as fighting on behalf of humanity against the forces of psychiatry. The "space opera" genre of the book and film manifests itself in numerous places in Scientology itself, most famously in OT III (the Xenu story). Travolta's own commitment to such a disastrous project as the film version of Battlefield Earth is, in Urban's estimation, indicative of his "unusual dedication" to Scientology.

Parodies 
South Park parodied the film at the 2000 MTV Movie Awards. The MTV short was the first time South Park had satirized Scientology, in a piece titled "The Gauntlet". The short was primarily a Gladiator parody, with the characters fighting Russell Crowe in the Roman Colosseum; it included "John Travolta and the Church of Scientology" arriving in a spaceship to defeat Crowe and attempting to recruit the boys into Scientology. Travolta, along with his fellow Scientologists, was depicted as a Psychlo, as he appeared in the film.

Fraud by Franchise Pictures 
Following the failure of Battlefield Earth and other films independently produced by Franchise Pictures, The Wall Street Journal reported that the FBI was probing "the question of whether some independent motion picture companies have vastly inflated the budget of films in an effort to scam investors". In December 2000 the German-based Intertainment AG filed a lawsuit alleging that Franchise Pictures had fraudulently inflated budgets in films including Battlefield Earth, which Intertainment had helped to finance. Intertainment had agreed to pay 47% of the production costs of several films in exchange for European distribution rights, but ended up paying for between 60 and 90% of the costs instead. The company alleged that Franchise had defrauded it to the tune of over $75 million by systematically submitting "grossly fraudulent and inflated budgets".

The case was heard before a jury in a Los Angeles federal courtroom in May–June 2004. The court heard testimony from Intertainment that according to Franchise's bank records the real cost of Battlefield Earth was $44 million, not the $75 million declared by Franchise. The remaining $31 million had been fraudulent "padding". Intertainment's head Barry Baeres told the court that he had only funded Battlefield Earth because it was packaged as a slate that included two more commercially attractive films, the Wesley Snipes vehicle The Art of War and the Bruce Willis comedy The Whole Nine Yards. Baeres testified that "Mr. Samaha said, 'If you want the other two pictures, you have to take Battlefield Earth — it's called packaging. Baeres commented: "We would have been quite happy if he had killed [Battlefield Earth]".

Intertainment won the case and was awarded $121.7 million in damages. Samaha was declared by the court to be personally liable for $77 million in damages. The jury rejected Intertainment's claims under the Racketeer Influenced and Corrupt Organizations Act (RICO) statute, which would have tripled the damages if Franchise had been convicted on that charge. The judgment forced Franchise into bankruptcy on August 19, 2007. The failure of the film was also reported to have led in 2002 to Travolta firing his manager Jonathan Krane, who had set up the deal with Franchise in the first place.

Cancelled follow-ups and sequels 
Battlefield Earth is significantly shorter than its source novel, covering only the first 436 pages of the 1,050-page book. A sequel covering the remainder of the book was originally planned at the outset. When asked during promotion of the film if there would be a Battlefield Earth 2, Travolta responded, "Sure. Yeah." Travolta asserted that the first film would become a cult classic, stating that there were already fan websites dedicated to the film. Corey Mandell, the scriptwriter for the first film, was commissioned to deliver the script for the sequel, and Travolta, Pepper and producer Krane were all signed up to the sequel in their contracts for the first film. Christian and Whitaker were approached to reprise their respective roles, and the producers planned for a 2003 release date so as not to compete with George Lucas' Star Wars: Episode II – Attack of the Clones.

Despite Travolta's initial commitment to a sequel, such plans never came to fruition. According to James Robert Parish's Fiasco: A History of Hollywood's Iconic Flops, the disastrous performance of Battlefield Earth and the collapse of Franchise Pictures made it very unlikely that a live-action sequel would be made. In a 2001 interview, Travolta stated that a sequel was not planned: "Ultimately the movie did $100 million when you count box office, DVD sales, video, and pay per view ... But I don't know what kind of number it would have to do to justify filming the second part of the book. And I don't want to push any buttons in the press and stir anybody up about it now." Author Services announced in 2001 that Pine Com International, a Tokyo-based animation studio, would produce 13 one-hour animated television segments based on the book and rendered in a manga style. The plans appear to have fallen through, and according to Parish, "little has been heard of the series since."

See also 

 21st Golden Raspberry Awards
 Box office bomb
 List of cult films
 List of films considered the worst
 List of films featuring slavery
 Orientation: A Scientology Information Film, which includes a testimonial from John Travolta.

References 

Further reading

External links 

 
 https://battlefieldearth.com/battlefield-earth/ 
 
 
 
 
 
 

 

2000 films
2000 science fiction action films
2000 controversies
American science fiction action films
American science fiction war films
2000s English-language films
American dystopian films
2000s dystopian films
Films about extraterrestrial life
Films about slavery
Films based on American novels
Films based on science fiction novels
Films directed by Roger Christian
Films scored by Elia Cmíral
Films set in the 30th century
Films set in Colorado
Films set in Kentucky
Films set in Texas
Films set in Washington, D.C.
Films set on fictional planets
Films shot in Los Angeles
Films shot in Montreal
Franchise Pictures films
American post-apocalyptic films
Scientology in popular culture
Morgan Creek Productions films
Warner Bros. films
Films produced by Elie Samaha
Golden Raspberry Award winning films
Films about nuclear war and weapons
Alien invasions in films
2000s American films